Dorunak Rural District is a rural district (dehestan) in Zeydun District, Behbahan County, Khuzestan Province, Iran. At the 2006 census, its population was 5,380, in 1,213 families.  The rural district has 23 villages.

References 

Rural Districts of Khuzestan Province
Behbahan County